Amer Delić (born June 30, 1982) is a Bosnian American former professional tennis player. He is a former captain and member of the Bosnia and Herzegovina Davis Cup team.

Delić was born in Tuzla, then in Yugoslavia, now in the northeastern part of Bosnia and Herzegovina. In 1996, his family emigrated to Jacksonville, Florida, where he attended Samuel W. Wolfson High School, a public high school with the largest Bosnian population in Florida.

Representing the United States as a tour player until 2009, he then began representing his country of birth, Bosnia and Herzegovina, and was a member of its Davis Cup team.

Career
Delić played High School Tennis at Wolfson High in Jacksonville, Florida. It was here that he won a State Championship.

Delić played collegiate tennis at the University of Illinois. At Illinois he won both the NCAA Division I singles and team championships in 2003.

In Grand Slams, Delić's best singles performance was to reach the third round at the 2009 Australian Open. In doubles Delić reached the third round of the US Open twice: with Jeff Morrison in 2005, having upset the team of Leander Paes and Nenad Zimonjić in the first round, and with Justin Gimelstob in 2007.

In March 2007, Delić reached the fourth round of the Miami Masters, upset World No. 4 Nikolay Davydenko en route in straight sets.

2009
Delić started off the year in Brisbane, where he won three qualifying matches, but was defeated in the first round by Mario Ančić 6–7(2), 7–6(4), 6–7(6). In Sydney he was defeated in the first round by Denis Gremelmayr 4–6, 6–7(4). At the Australian Open, Amer finally started to win. He came through three qualifying matches, but lost in the qualifying stage. When he was awarded into a lucky loser spot after Filippo Volandri banned from a drug substantial use. In the first round of the main draw he defeated Taylor Dent 6–4, 3–6, 4–6, 6–3, 6–4. In the second round he defeated Paul-Henri Mathieu 1–6, 3–6, 6–3, 7–6(3) 9–7. In the third round he was stopped by Novak Djokovic 2–6, 6–4, 3–6, 6–7(4). After the match spectators were caught throwing chairs at each other due to the conflict between Bosnians and Serbs. Due to a knee injury, Delić's last 2009 appearance on the ATP tour was a first round loss against Nicolas Mahut at the Hall of Fame Tennis Championships in July.

2010: Comeback and Davis Cup play for Bosnia and Herzegovina
At the US Open, Delić tried a comeback but lost in the first qualification round against Michael Yani. In September, he joined the Bosnia and Herzegovina Davis Cup team for a tie in the Europe/Africa Group II against Portugal. He lost both his singles match against Frederico Gil in five sets and his doubles match on the side of Aldin Šetkić to Gil and Leonardo Tavares in four sets. Overall, after a 2:3 loss, his team stayed in Group II.

2011
In March, Delić participated in the Bosnia and Herzegovina team's Davis Cup tie in the Europe/Africa Zone Group II against Morocco. He won one of his two singles matches and the doubles match (on the side of Ismar Gorčić), thereby securing his team's victory. In the next tie against Estonia played in July, Delić won all his three matches decidedly helping his team to advance to the next stage against Denmark. There, he again won his two singles matches but not the doubles match so the team stayed in Group II. On the ATP Tour, Delić won his first title since 2008 at the BH Telecom Indoors at Sarajevo, a challenger tournament.

2012

In Davis Cup play, Delić again was instrumental in securing his team's win over Turkey in February by winning both his singles matches and the doubles match.

2015

Having been named Bosnia's Davis Cup captain in 2013, Amer made his comeback to professional tennis against Hungary in the 2015 Davis Cup after Bosnia was short a player, ultimately helping Bosnia win a doubles match. In addition to serving as their captain, Delić also served as Bosnia's reserve Davis Cup player in case of emergency.

2020

In October 2020, Delić announced a return to semi-professional tennis, partnering golfer Sergio García in a doubles tournament to be held in Austin, Texas. The pair lost their opening match at the Men's UTR Pro Tennis Open DropShot event.

ATP Challenger and ITF Futures finals

Singles: 17 (8–9)

Doubles: 6 (3–3)

Performance timelines

Singles

Doubles

References

External links

 
 
 
 Illinois profile

1982 births
Living people
American male tennis players
Bosnia and Herzegovina emigrants to the United States
Bosnia and Herzegovina male tennis players
Illinois Fighting Illini men's tennis players
Sportspeople from Tuzla
Sportspeople from Jacksonville, Florida
Tennis people from Florida
Big Ten Athlete of the Year winners